The Kuala Lumpur Major was a Dota 2 tournament, as part of the 2018–2019 Dota Pro Circuit season. The event was held from 9–18 November 2018 hosted at Axiata Arena in Kuala Lumpur.

16 teams are involved, of which 15 came through qualifying competitions. Three teams each from Europe, China, and North America and two teams each from CIS, Southeast Asia, and South America. Tigers won DreamLeague Season 10, earned an invite as a Minor champion.

Teams

Qualification

Regional qualifiers began from 16 to 21 September 2018.

Europe (3)
  Team Secret
  Alliance
  Ninjas in Pyjamas

China (3)
  PSG.LGD
  Vici Gaming
  Team Aster

North America (3)
  Evil Geniuses
  Forward Gaming
  J.Storm

CIS (2)
  Virtus.pro
  Gambit Esports

Southeast Asia (2)
  Fnatic
  TNC Predator

South America (2)
  Pain Gaming
  Pain X

Minor champion (1)
  Tigers

Group stage

Group stage began from 9 to 10 November 2018.

Competing teams were divided into four groups of four teams (groups A to D). The winner of first two series (best of three) on each group would automatically go to Upper Bracket, and loser of first two series go to Lower Bracket. Last series would be a decider match for Upper Bracket or Lower Bracket.

Ivan Borislavov "Mind Control" stand-in for Ninjas in Pyjamas replacing Neta Shapira "33", due to problems with travel visa between Israel–Malaysia relations.

Main event

Main event was be held from 11 to 18 November 2018.

It featured two brackets in a double-elimination tournament format. In the upper brackets, played to best-of-three, the winning team moved on, while the losing team would then be placed in respective rounds of the lower bracket. The winner of the upper bracket moved to the Grand Finals. The first round in the lower bracket was played as a best-of-one, with the loser being immediately eliminated. All other matches were best-of-three, with the winner of the lower bracket advancing to the Grand Finals, which was a best-of-five series, to face the winner of the upper bracket.

Upper bracket

Lower bracket

Grand Finals

The grand finals took place between Virtus Pro, who advanced from the lower bracket, and Team Secret, who advanced from the upper bracket, with Virtus Pro defeating Team Secret 3–2 in a best-of-five series.

References

External links
 Official website
 Dota Pro Circuit 2018 - 2019

2010s in Kuala Lumpur
2018 in Malaysian sport
2018 multiplayer online battle arena tournaments
Dota 2 Majors
International esports competitions hosted by Malaysia
November 2018 sports events in Asia
Sports competitions in Kuala Lumpur
Professional Gamers League competitions